Samia Aouni (born 30 May 1992) is a Tunisian footballer who plays as a left back for Saudi side Al Nassr and the Tunisia women's national team.

Club career
Aouni has played for Amman in Jordan.

International career
Aouni has capped for Tunisia at senior level, including two friendly away wins over Jordan in June 2021.

International goals
Scores and results list Tunisia's goal tally first

See also
List of Tunisia women's international footballers

References

External links

1992 births
Living people
Tunisian women's footballers
Women's association football fullbacks
Tunisia women's international footballers
Tunisian expatriate footballers
Tunisian expatriate sportspeople in Jordan
Expatriate footballers in Jordan
Saudi Women's Premier League players